The 53rd Primetime Emmy Awards were held on Sunday, November 4, 2001, seven weeks later than originally scheduled. The ceremony was rescheduled twice from its original date of September 16 at the Shrine Auditorium because of the September 11, 2001 attacks that occurred five days prior to the event. It was also removed from its rescheduled date of October 7 again at the same venue as a result of the start of the War in Afghanistan. The event was then relocated to the smaller Shubert Theater, which had previously hosted the 1973 and 1976 ceremonies, and would be demolished in 2002. The ceremony was hosted by Ellen DeGeneres and was broadcast on CBS.

Barbra Streisand sang "You'll Never Walk Alone" in a surprise appearance at the close, in honor of the victims of the attacks.

Sex and the City became the first premium channel show to win Outstanding Comedy Series; this was its only major award. The NBC cult hit Freaks and Geeks accomplished a rare feat: though it only ran for one season, it was nominated in two different years for writing. Frasier, now in its eighth season, earned its final Outstanding Comedy Series nomination after eight consecutive nominations including five consecutive wins (seasons 1–5).

The episode "Bowling" made Malcolm in the Middle just the second show, and first comedy, to have two different episodes win awards for directing and writing. The Defenders was the first show to do this in 1963 and 1965. (Specific episodes were not nominated in the comedy categories until the late 1960s). Game of Thrones would also achieve this in 2015 and 2016.

For his portrayal of John Cage in Ally McBeal, Peter MacNicol won Outstanding Supporting Actor in a Comedy Series, the first in this category for Fox and the first in this category for any show outside the Big Three television networks.

In the drama field, The West Wing won Outstanding Drama Series for its second straight year and led all shows with four major awards on the night. The Sopranos led all shows with 14 major nominations and was second to The West Wing with three major wins.

Mike Nichols' win made him the ninth person to become an EGOT winner.

Winners and nominees
Winners are listed first, highlighted in boldface, and indicated with a double dagger (‡). For simplicity, producers who received nominations for program awards, as well as nominated writers for Outstanding Writing for a Variety or Music Program, have been omitted.

Programs

Acting

Lead performances

Supporting performances

Directing

Writing

Most major nominations
By network 
 HBO – 44
 NBC – 43
 ABC – 24
 CBS – 15
 Fox – 13

By program
 The Sopranos (HBO) – 14
 The West Wing (NBC) – 12
 Malcolm in the Middle (Fox) – 8
 Will & Grace (NBC) – 7
 Anne Frank: The Whole Story (ABC) / Conspiracy (HBO) / Frasier (NBC) / Life with Judy Garland: Me and My Shadows (ABC) – 6

Most major awards
By network 
 HBO – 8
 NBC – 8
 ABC – 4
 CBS – 3
 Fox – 3
 Bravo – 2

By program
 The West Wing (NBC) – 4
 The Sopranos (HBO) – 3

Notes

In Memoriam

 Carroll O'Connor
 Jack Elliott
 Richard Mulligan
 William Hanna
 Robert Trout
 Perry Como
 Rosemary DeCamp
 Alan Rafkin
 John Cannon
 Werner Klemperer
 Dale Evans
 Arlene Francis
 Stan Margulies
 Beah Richards
 Fred de Cordova
 Ann Sothern
 Ray Walston
 Imogene Coca
 Victor Borge
 Jack Haley Jr.
 Jason Robards
 Kathleen Freeman
 Jack Lemmon
 Steve Allen
 Barbara Olson
 Berry Berenson
 David Angell

Notes

References

External links
 Emmys.com list of 2001 Nominees & Winners
 

053
2001 television awards
2001 in Los Angeles
November 2001 events in the United States
Impact of the September 11 attacks on television